The 1948 Milan–San Remo was the 39th edition of the Milan–San Remo cycle race and was held on 19 March 1948. The race started in Milan and finished in San Remo. The race was won by Fausto Coppi of the  team.

General classification

References

Milan–San Remo
Milan-San Remo
Milan-San Remo
Milan–San Remo
Milan-San Remo